The First Shadow Cabinet of Edward Heath was created on 28 July 1965 after the Conservative Party elected Edward Heath as its leader, replacing Sir Alec Douglas-Home.

Shadow cabinet list

References 

Official Opposition (United Kingdom)
British shadow cabinets
1965 in British politics
1965 establishments in the United Kingdom
1970 disestablishments in the United Kingdom
Edward Heath